Edward Williams, better known by his bardic name Iolo Morganwg (10 March 1747 – 18 December 1826), was a Welsh antiquarian, poet and collector. He was seen as an expert collector of Medieval Welsh literature, but it emerged after his death that he had forged several manuscripts, notably some of the Third Series of Welsh Triads. Even so, he had a lasting impact on Welsh culture, notably in founding the secret society known as the Gorsedd, through which Iolo Morganwg successfully co-opted the 18th-century Eisteddfod revival. The philosophy he spread in his forgeries has had an enormous impact upon neo-Druidism. His bardic name is Welsh for "Iolo of Glamorgan".

Early life
Edward Williams was born at Pen Onn, near Llancarfan in Glamorgan, Wales, and raised in the village of Flemingston (or Flimston; Trefflemin in Welsh). He followed his father as a stonemason. In Glamorgan he took an interest in manuscript collection, and learnt to compose Welsh poetry from poets such as Lewis Hopkin, Rhys Morgan, and especially Siôn Bradford. In 1773 he moved to London, where the antiquary Owen Jones introduced him to the city's Welsh literary community, and where he became a member of the Gwyneddigion Society: he would later also be active in the Cymreigyddion Society. In 1777 he returned to Wales, where he married and tried farming, but without success. During this time he produced his first forgeries.

Williams's son, Taliesin (bardic name, Taliesin ab Iolo), whom he had named after the early medieval bard Taliesin, later went on to collect his manuscripts in 26 volumes, a selection being published as the Iolo Manuscripts by the Welsh Manuscripts Society in 1848.

Literary career
From an early date Williams was concerned with preserving and maintaining the literary and cultural traditions of Wales. He produced a large number of manuscripts as evidence for his claims that ancient Druidic tradition had survived the Roman conquest, the conversion of the populace to Christianity, the persecution of bards under King Edward I, and other adversities. His forgeries develop an elaborate mystical philosophy, which he claimed as a direct continuation of ancient Druidic practice. Williams's reportedly heavy use of laudanum may have been a contributing factor.

Williams first came to public notice in 1789 for Barddoniaeth Dafydd ab Gwilym, a collection of the poetry of the 14th-century Dafydd ap Gwilym. Included were a large number of hitherto unknown poems by Dafydd that he claimed to have found; these are regarded as Williams's first forgeries. His success led him to return to London in 1791, where he founded the Gorsedd, a community of Welsh bards, at a ceremony on 21 June 1792 at Primrose Hill. He organised the occasion according to what he claimed were ancient Druidic rites. In 1794 he published some of his own poetry, which was later collected in a two-volume Poems, Lyric and Pastoral. Essentially his only genuine work, it proved quite popular.

Williams worked with Owen Jones and William Owen Pughe on The Myvyrian Archaiology of Wales, a three-volume collection of medieval Welsh literature published in 1801–1807. This relied partly on manuscripts in Williams's collection, some his forgeries. The forged material included a false Brut chronicle and a book attributed to Saint Cadoc. The second volume, which collected the Welsh Triads, contained an additional "third series" of forged triads, as well as Williams's alterations to the authentic ones.

After Williams's death some of his collection was compiled into The Iolo Manuscripts by his son, Taliesin Williams. His papers were used by many later scholars and translators, and for reference by Lady Charlotte Guest as she translated the prose collection Mabinogion. She did not, however, rely on William's editions of the tales themselves, except for Hanes Taliesin. Later still, further Williams forgeries were published in a text known as Barddas. This work, published in two volumes in 1862 and 1874, was claimed to be a translation of works by Llywelyn Siôn, detailing the history of the Welsh bardic system from its ancient origins to the present day. Though it contains nothing of authentic Druidic lore, it is the fullest account of the mystical cosmology Williams developed. Other works by Williams include the "Druid's Prayer", still used by the Gorsedd and by neo-Druid groups, a treatise on Welsh metrics called Cyfrinach Beirdd Ynys Prydain ("The Mystery of the Bards of the Isle of Britain"), published posthumously in 1828, and a hymn series published as Salmau yr Eglwys yn yr Anialwch ("Psalms of the church in the wilderness") in 1812.

Philosophy
Iolo's philosophy represented a fusion of Christian and Arthurian influences, a romanticism comparable to that of William Blake and the Scottish poet and forger James MacPherson, the revived antiquarian enthusiasm for all things "Celtic", and such elements of bardic heritage as had genuinely survived among Welsh-language poets. Part of his aim was to assert the Welshness of South Wales, particularly his home region of Glamorgan, against the prevalent idea that North Wales represented the purest survival of Welsh traditions. The metaphysics elucidated in his forgeries and other works proposed a theory of concentric "rings of existence", proceeding outward from Annwn (the Otherworld) through Abred and Ceugant to Gwynfyd (purity or Heaven).

Outside his shop in Cowbridge was a sign saying his sugar was from plantations that employed no slaves. However, he contested a will in order to receive a legacy from one of his three brothers, all of whose plantations in Jamaica used slave labour.

By 1799 he had become a Unitarian and a leading spirit when a Unitarian Association was formed in South Wales in 1802. It was he who drew up its Rheolau a Threfniadau (Rules and Procedures), published in 1803.

Bardic alphabet

Iolo Morganwg developed his own runic system based on an ancient druid alphabet system, in Welsh Coelbren y Beirdd ("the Bardic Alphabet"). It was said to be the alphabetic system of the ancient druids. It consisted of 20 main letters, and 20 others "to represent elongated vowels and mutations." These symbols were to be represented in a wooden frame, known as peithynen.

Exposure
Towards the end of the 19th century, the grammarian Sir John Morris-Jones was involved in exposing Iolo as a forger, which led to the bard being labelled a charlatan. Morris-Jones called Iolo "hateful" and said it would be an age "before our history and literature are clean of the traces of his dirty fingers."

After the First World War, the scholar Griffith John Williams (1892–1963) was the first to make a full study of Iolo's work, consulting original documents donated to the National Library of Wales by Iolo's descendants in 1917. Williams aimed to find out exactly how much of Iolo's output was based on imagination rather than fact. He established that the poems Iolo attributed to Dafydd ap Gwilym were forgeries. His researches led him to become a defender of Iolo's reputation as well as a critic.

It has been suggested that some of Iolo's claims were supported by oral tradition: recent research has revealed that the tale of Ieuan Gethin, a soldier in the Glyndŵr revolt, might have basis in fact.

Legacy

Such was the extent of his forgery that, even into the 21st century, some of his tampered versions of medieval Welsh texts are better known than the original versions.

A Welsh-language school in Cowbridge, Ysgol Iolo Morganwg, is named after him, and Super Furry Animals vocalist Gruff Rhys dedicated a song to him on his 2014 album, American Interior.

See also
Geraint the Blue Bard
List of 18th-century British working-class writers

References

Further reading

Geraint Jenkins, ed. (2005), A Rattleskull Genius: the Many Faces of Iolo Morganwg. Cardiff: University of Wales Press

Prys Morgan (1975), Iolo Morganwg (Writers of Wales). Cardiff: University of Wales Press

G. J. Williams (1956), Iolo Morganwg. Y Gyfrol Gyntaf. Cardiff: University of Wales Press
G. J. Williams (1926), Iolo Morganwg a Chywyddau'r Ychwanegiad. Cardiff: University of Wales Press

External links

Iolo Morganwg and the Romantic Tradition in Wales Project at the Centre for Advanced Welsh and Celtic Studies, University of Wales
Biography of Iolo Morganwg (English) in Dictionary of Unitarian and Universalist Biography (DUUB)
The Barddas of Iolo Morganwg, vol. 1 (English text only) at Internet Sacred Text Archive
The Barddas of Iolo Morganwg, vol. 2 (English text only) at Internet Sacred Text Archive
Amgueddfa Cymru – National Museum Wales, Antiquaries in Wales

1747 births
1826 deaths
Bards of the Gorsedd
Forgers
Literary forgeries
Mythopoeic writers
Neo-druids
People from Glamorgan
Pseudepigraphy
St Athan
Stonemasons
Welsh-language poets
Welsh poets
Welsh Unitarians